Lake Centre was a federal electoral district in Saskatchewan, Canada, that was represented in the House of Commons of Canada from 1935 to 1953. This riding was created in 1933 from parts of the ridings of Last Mountain, Long Lake and Regina.

From 1940 to 1953, the riding's Member of Parliament was John Diefenbaker, who later served as Prime Minister of Canada from 1957 to 1963.

It was abolished in 1952 when it was redistributed into Melville, Moose Jaw—Lake Centre, Rosetown—Biggar and Yorkton ridings.

Election results

See also 

 List of Canadian federal electoral districts
 Past Canadian electoral districts

External links 
 

Former federal electoral districts of Saskatchewan